NGC 1808 is a barred spiral galaxy located in the southern constellation of Columba, about two degrees to the south and east of Gamma Caeli. It was discovered by Scottish astronomer James Dunlop, who described it as a "faint nebula". The galaxy is a member of the NGC 1808 group, which is part of the larger Dorado Group.

The morphological classification of this galaxy is (R)SAB(s)a, which indicates a spiral galaxy with a weak-bar around the nucleus (SAB), no ring around the bar (s), an outer ring (R), and tightly-wound spiral arms (a). It is inclined by an angle of 57° to the line of sight from the Earth, with the long axis oriented at a position angle of 324°. The disk of gas and stars shows a noticeable warp, and there is a pronounced asymmetry in the distribution of neutral hydrogen and H II regions.

These form a ring of peculiar "hot spots". It was formerly identified as a possible Seyfert galaxy, but evidence now points to starburst activity in a  radius around the center. A probable outflow of gas is directed to the north-east from the nucleus, forming prominent dust lanes. The high level of star formation in this galaxy and the nearby NGC 1792 may indicate a recent, distant tidal interaction between the two.

References

External links 
 
 Pictures and description at Hubble Heritage website

Intermediate spiral galaxies
Starburst galaxies
Columba (constellation)
1808
16779